Midway Music Hall is a nightclub and live music venue located in South Edmonton, Canada. The mega club hosts various events such as concerts, DJ's, and live music events. The venue has hosted global artists such as the Backstreet Boys, JoJo, Lil Pump, Method Man, Pauly D, Redman, and many others.

Background 
The nightclub has a capacity of 1,300 people and is expected to play up to 150 events per year, featuring general admission, VIP and seating options. Construction began in June 2019 and its opening night was September 20, 2019, when the venue officially opened to the public.

References

External links 
 

Nightclubs in Canada
Music venues in Canada by city
Music venues in Alberta
Nightclubs in Alberta
2019 establishments in Canada
Music venues in Edmonton